Ketil Gudim (born 6 November 1956) is a Norwegian dancer and actor. He was born in Sarpsborg.  A bust of Gudim, made by Nina Sundbye, is located at the Oslo Opera House.

External links

References

1956 births
Living people
People from Sarpsborg
Norwegian male actors
Norwegian male dancers